The Xiamen–Shenzhen railway, also known as the Xiashen railway, is a dual-track, electrified, high-speed rail line connecting the major coastal cities of Xiamen in Fujian and Shenzhen in Guangdong. Construction of the Xiashen line began on November 23, 2007, and the line entered into operation on December 28, 2013.

Speed has been increased since April 10, 2021 and travel time reduced again to 2 hours and 30 minutes Currently, CR Guangzhou offers C-train services from Shenzhen North to Shenzhen Pingshan, Huizhou South and Shanwei.

Route
The Xiamen–Shenzhen railway follows the rugged southern coast of China. Major cities and towns along route include Zhangzhou, Zhao'an, Raoping, the Chaoshan region (Chaozhou and Shantou), Puning, Shanwei, Huidong and Huizhou.

The railway will be partially paralleled by the Shenzhen–Shanwei and Shanwei–Shantou high-speed railways, currently under construction.

History
The Xiamen–Shenzhen railway is the first railway to be built on the southern coast of China. Most high-speed rail lines in China follow the routes of older conventional railways, but there were no railways on the southeast coast before the arrival of high-speed rail.

Historically, the southeast coastal region relied on maritime transportation, and rugged terrain made railway construction more expensive. In the first half of the 20th century, warfare and political instability delayed railway construction. During the Cold War, the southeast coast faced the threat of invasion from Republic of China on Taiwan and all railways were built inland. Only when political tensions across the Taiwan Strait eased in the late 1990s did planning of the Xiashen Line proceed.

Construction of the Xiashen Line commenced in November 2007 and the line was initially expected to open in 2011. But the anticipated completion was repeatedly delayed due to further safety reviews and inspections after the Wenzhou High-Speed rail crash. In December 2012, the anticipated opening date was pushed to October 2013. Test runs did not commence until November 2013. The line officially opened on December 28, 2013 with trains running from Shenzhen North to Shanghai Hongqiao.

In 2017, cumulative ridership of the line exceeded 53 million passengers, with daily services increased to 101 trains in each direction.

In February 2021, it was announced that operating speeds on the line would be increased from  starting on 10 April, resulting in the fastest journeys between Xiamen North and Shenzhen North being reduced to 2.5 hours.

Rail connections
Xiamen: Fuzhou–Xiamen railway, Yingtan–Xiamen railway
Zhangzhou: Longyan–Xiamen railway
Chaoshan: Guangzhou–Meizhou–Shantou railway towards Shantou railway station. 
Chaoshan: Meizhou–Chaoshan railway towards Meizhou West railway station.
Shanwei: Guangzhou–Shanwei high-speed railway and Shantou–Shanwei high-speed railway, both under construction. 
Shenzhen Pingshan: Guangzhou–Shenzhen railway - at some point after leaving the station in the southwest direction, trains can switch to the northwest-bound direction of the GuangShen railway towards Guangzhou East station / Guangzhou station, or vice versa. 
Shenzhen North: Beijing–Guangzhou–Shenzhen–Hong Kong high-speed railway and Ganzhou–Shenzhen high-speed railway

See also

 List of railways in China

References

Railway lines in China
Rail transport in Fujian
Rail transport in Guangdong
Railway lines opened in 2013
25 kV AC railway electrification